Heat Seekers is an American reality television series on the Food Network. The series officially debuted on July 22, 2011, but one episode aired prior on July 17, 2011. The second season of the series premiered on January 16, 2012.

Premise
The series follows chefs Aarón Sanchez and Roger Mooking as they work to discover and taste some of the spiciest food across the United States.

Episodes

Season 1: 2011

Season 2: 2012

References

External links
 
 
 Heat Seekers on TV.com

2010s American reality television series
2011 American television series debuts
English-language television shows
Food Network original programming
2012 American television series endings